Cibla Parish is an administrative unit of Ludza Municipality in the Latgale region of Latvia.

References

Parishes of Latvia
Ludza Municipality
Latgale